The Very Best of Bananarama is a greatest hits album by English group Bananarama, released on 15 October 2001 by Warner Strategic Marketing and London Records. It was released to celebrate the group's 20th anniversary, including their singles released from 1981 to 1993. The album reached number 43 on the UK Albums Chart.

This compilation features the "single" versions of the songs. Various tracks had been edited or remixed from their original album versions for their releases as singles and in the case of "I Want You Back" and "Nathan Jones", the vocals were re-recorded after original member Siobhan Fahey had left the group and been replaced by Jacquie O'Sullivan.  "Nathan Jones" was also included on the Rain Man soundtrack as well as their Greatest Hits Collection.

A limited edition of The Very Best of Bananarama, released in 2002, contained a second disc of remixes and replaced the "Tempus Fugit megamix" for the Miami mix of "I Heard a Rumour".

Track listing
Standard version
 "Venus"
 "Love in the First Degree"
 "Robert De Niro's Waiting..."
 "I Heard a Rumour"
 "Cruel Summer"
 "Na Na Hey Hey Kiss Him Goodbye"
 "It Ain't What You Do (It's the Way That You Do It)" (with Fun Boy Three)
 "Really Saying Something" (with Fun Boy Three)
 "I Want You Back"
 "Nathan Jones"
 "Shy Boy"
 "More, More, More"
 "Only Your Love"
 "I Can't Help It"
 "Love, Truth and Honesty"
 "Rough Justice"
 "Last Thing on My Mind"
 "Long Train Running"
 "Preacher Man"
 "Movin' On"
 "Help!" (with Lananeeneenoonoo)
 "Tempus Fugit Megamix"

Limited 2-CD edition
Disc one
 "Venus"
 "Love in the First Degree"
 "Robert De Niro's Waiting..."
 "I Heard a Rumour"
 "Cruel Summer"
 "Na Na Hey Hey Kiss Him Goodbye"
 "T'ain't What You Do (It's the Way That You Do It)" (with Fun Boy Three)
 "Really Saying Something" (with Fun Boy Three)
 "I Want You Back"
 "Nathan Jones"
 "Shy Boy"
 "More, More, More"
 "Only Your Love"
 "I Can't Help It"
 "Love, Truth and Honesty"
 "Rough Justice"
 "Last Thing on My Mind"
 "Long Train Running"
 "Preacher Man"
 "Movin' On"
 "Help!" (with Lananeeneenoonoo)
 "I Heard a Rumour" (Miami Mix)

Disc two
 "Venus" (Hellfire Mix)
 "Love in the First Degree" (Eurobeat Style)
 "Movin' On" (Bumpin' Mix)
 "Cruel Summer" (Swing Beat Dub)
 "Only Your Love" (Milky Bar Mix)
 "Tripping on Your Love" (Euro Trance Mix)
 "I Want You Back" (Extended European Mix)
 "Nathan Jones" (1988 Extended Version)
 "I Can't Help It" (Extended Club Mix)

Charts

References

2001 greatest hits albums
Bananarama compilation albums
London Records compilation albums